24 Deep is the debut studio EP by American rapper Brotha Lynch Hung. It was released in 1993 through Black Market Records.

Track listing 
All songs written, produced, mixed and performed by Brotha Lynch Hung

Samples
"Thought They Knew (Intro)" contains a sample of Modaji as performed by Harvey Mason.
"24 Deep" contains sampled drum patterns from Synthetic Substitution performed by Melvin Bliss and melody sampled from I've Been Watching You by Southside Movement.
"Had 2 Gat Ya" contains samples from Deep Cover by Snoop Dogg and Dr. Dre ("187 on the..." as said by Snoop Dogg) and How I Could Just Kill a Man by Cypress Hill ("Ya know I had to gat ya" said by Sen Dog).
"Had 2 Gat Ya" also contains a sample of More Bounce to the Ounce as performed by Zapp.
"Lose a Hoe, Gain a Hoe" contains a sample of "Hold On" as performed by En Vogue.
"Back Fade" also contains sampled drum patterns from Synthetic Substitution as performed by Melvin Bliss and 6 O'clock DJ (Let's Rock) as performed by Rose Royce.
"Jackin' For Joints" contains a sample from "Atomic Dog" by George Clinton, "Jungle Love by The Time and "Jackin' For Beats" performed by Ice Cube.
"Walkin' 2 My Funeral" contains a sample of You Remind Me as performed by Patrice Rushen.
"Fundamentals of Ripgut Cannibalism (Outro)" also contains a sample of 6 O'clock DJ (Let's Rock) as performed by Rose Royce.

Chart positions

References

1993 debut EPs
Brotha Lynch Hung EPs